Orée-d'Anjou (literally Edge of Anjou) is a commune in the Maine-et-Loire department of western France. Champtoceaux is the municipal seat.

History 
It was established on 15 December 2015 and consists of the former communes of Bouzillé, Champtoceaux, Drain, Landemont, Liré, Saint-Christophe-la-Couperie, Saint-Laurent-des-Autels, Saint-Sauveur-de-Landemont and La Varenne.

Population

See also 
Communes of the Maine-et-Loire department

References 

OreedAnjou
States and territories established in 2015